Charles Lloyd (8 September 1835 – 8 October 1908) was a pipe organ builder based in Nottingham who flourished between 1859 and 1908.

Family
He was born in London on 8 September 1835, the son of Samuel Lloyd a shoemaker. He was baptised on 18 March 1838 in St Pancras New Church. In 1851, aged 15, he was described as "apprentice organ builder".

He married Mary Ann Dennison (b ca. 1841 in Nottingham) in 1864.

Background
Charles Lloyd had previously worked for Samuel Groves of London. Lloyd set up in business first with Lorenzo Valentine and shortly afterwards with Alfred Dudgeon. Their workshop was at 52A Union Road, near the centre of Nottingham. The company Valentine and Dudgeon was started in 1859. They were soon at work installing organs in places of worship in and around the Nottingham area. Lloyd was commissioned by Sydney Pierrepont, 3rd Earl Manvers of Holme Pierrepont, to construct and exhibit a two manual and pedal organ at the Birmingham Trades Exhibition in 1865. It won Lloyd a gold medal award for its workmanship and tone. After the exhibition, the organ was moved back to Nottingham and installed in St. Edmund's Church, Holme Pierrepont.

Charles Lloyd & Co.
Lloyd & Dudgeon were partners until the death of Albert Dudgeon on 6 February 1874. The company name was then changed to Charles Lloyd & Co., Church Organ Builders, Nottingham.

When the Great Central Railway was brought to Nottingham in 1896, land occupied by the Lloyd business had to be cleared to make way for the Victoria Station. Lloyd moved to 79 Brighton Street, St Ann's.

In 1909, his son, Charles Frederick Lloyd took over the business and it continued until 1928 with no change to the name. The company was then acquired by Roger Yates.

Company names and addresses
Lloyd and Valentine 1859 – 1860, Bilbie Street, Nottingham
Lloyd and Valentine 1861, 19 William Street, and 6 Sherwood Street, Nottingham
Lloyd and Dudgeon 1862 – 1876, 52A Union Road, Nottingham
Charles Lloyd & Co. 1876 – 1896, 52A Union Road, Nottingham
Charles Lloyd & Co. 1896 – 1928, 79 Brighton Street, St Ann's, Nottingham

Apprentices
The first was Ernest Wragg of Carlton who, after his period of training, set up as an organ builder himself in 1894 on Carlton Road, Thorneywood, as E. Wragg & Son, Organ Builders.

The second was John Compton, born in Measham, Leicestershire. He entered into organ building first at Birmingham, then with Brindley of Sheffield, then in Nottingham under Charles Lloyd. When free of his apprenticeship in 1902, along with an organ builder named Musson of Woodborough Road, Nottingham, they became Compton & Musson.

Noted instruments
Union Workhouse, Melton Mowbray, Leicestershire 1859
Scalford Church 1859
Melton Mowbray Wesleyan Church 1859
St George's Church, Leicester 1860 additions
All Saints Church, Loughborough 1862 additions
Holy Trinity Church, Bulcote, Nottinghamshire 1862
St Ann's Church, St Ann's Well Road, Nottingham 1864
St John the Baptist's Church, Leenside, Nottingham 1865
All Saints' Church, Nottingham 1865
St. Paul's Church, Hyson Green, Nottingham 1865
St. Edmund's Church, Holme Pierrepont 1865
St Mary's Church, Evedon, Lincolnshire 1866
St Mary's Church, Cromford, Derbyshire ca. 1868 additions
Broad Street Baptist Church, Nottingham 1869
All Saints' Church, Mackworth, Derbyshire 1870
St. Andrew's Church, Nottingham from St Mary's Church, Nottingham 1871
St John's Church, Codnor 1876 enlargement
All Saints' Church, Findern, Derbyshire 1876
St James' Church, Swarkestone, Derbyshire ca. 1876
Thoresby Church 1876
St Helen's Church, Burton Joyce, 1879
Congregational Church, Middleton-by-Wirksworth, Derbyshire, ca 1880
Holy Trinity Church, Middleton-by-Wirksworth, Derbyshire, ca 1880
Shaw Lane Methodist Church, Milford, Derbyshire, ca 1880
St. Thomas' Church, Nottingham 1882
Chellaston Methodist Church, High Street, Chellaston, Derbyshire 1882
Riddings Congregational Church, Alfreton, Derbyshire 1883
St James' Church, Riddings 1885 (enlargement)
Addison Street Congregational Church, Nottingham 1885
Holloway Methodist Church, Church Street, Holloway, Derbyshire ca. 1885
St Luke's Church, Hickling (restoration) 1886
St. Bartholomew's Church, Nottingham 1887
St Barnabas' Church, Derby, 1889
St Lawrence's Church, North Wingfield, Derbyshire, 1890
St Mary and St Barlock's Church, Norbury, Derbyshire 1890
St. Sebastian's Church, Great Gonerby, Lincolnshire, 1890
St Michael's Church, Hoveringham 1891
Wood Street Primitive Methodist Church, Ripley, Derbyshire, 1892
Somercotes Church, Alfreton, Derbyshire 1894
St Bartholomew's Church, Clay Cross, Derbyshire 1894
St. Andrew's Church, Barrow Hill, Derbyshire 1895
Draycott Methodist Church, Market Street, Draycott, Derbyshire ca. 1897
St. Giles Church, West Bridgford, Nottingham 1899 at a cost of £500. It was a three manual and pedal with choir organ prepared for. It was rebuilt and enlarged by Henry Willis & Sons in 1952, and removed in 1993.
Ebenezer Methodist Church, Newhall, Derbyshire ca. 1900 (in 2008 installed in Swadlincote Baptist Church)
Christ Church, St Albans, Hertfordshire, ca. 1900 rebuilt and enlarged
Methodist Church, Bingham Road, Cotgrave, Nottinghamshire 1900
Free Church, Upper Broughton, Nottinghamshire ca. 1900
St John the Evangelist's Church, Hazelwood, Derbyshire 1902
All Saints' Church, Kirk Hallam Derbyshire 1904
St. Michael and All Angels, Alvaston, Derbyshire 1904
Albion Congregational Church, Sneinton, Nottingham 1905
Carlton Methodist Church, Nottingham 1905
St Thomas' Church, Brampton, Derbyshire 1906
St. John's Church, Ripley, Derbyshire 1906 (now in St. Mary the Virgin, Stoke Bruerne, Northamptonshire)
St John's Church, Newhall, Derbyshire 1909
St. Mary's Church, Greasley, Nottinghamshire 1910

References

British pipe organ builders
People from Nottingham
1835 births
1908 deaths
Musical instrument manufacturing companies of the United Kingdom